Aridani Arbelo Santana (born 8 March 1980), known as Aridani, is a Spanish footballer who plays for Arucas CF as a left back.

Club career
Born in Las Palmas, Canary Islands, Aridani graduated from local CD Tenerife's youth system, making his senior debuts with the reserves in the 1999–00 season, in the Tercera División. On 14 May 2000 he made his professional debut, starting in a 0–0 home draw against CD Leganés in the Segunda División championship.

After appearing with UD Vecindario and UD Pájara Playas de Jandía in the Segunda División B, Aridani signed with second-tier UD Las Palmas in August 2003. However, after featuring sparingly with the Canarians, he returned to his previous club in the following summer.

In the following seasons Aridani competed in the third and fourth tiers, representing CD Leganés, CD Orientación Marítima, CD Toledo, CD Linares, UD Villa de Santa Brígida, UB Conquense (two stints), CD Puertollano, CD Castellón and Villarrubia CF.

References

External links

1980 births
Living people
Footballers from Las Palmas
Spanish footballers
Association football defenders
Segunda División players
Segunda División B players
Tercera División players
CD Tenerife B players
CD Tenerife players
UD Vecindario players
UD Las Palmas players
CD Leganés players
CD Toledo players
CD Linares players
UB Conquense footballers
CD Puertollano footballers
CD Castellón footballers